The El Dorado Apartments in Fond du Lac, Wisconsin were built in 1921.  The building was listed on the National Register of Historic Places in 1992.

References

Fond du Lac, Wisconsin
Neoclassical architecture in Wisconsin
Residential buildings completed in 1921
Buildings and structures in Fond du Lac County, Wisconsin
Residential buildings on the National Register of Historic Places in Wisconsin
Apartment buildings in Wisconsin
National Register of Historic Places in Fond du Lac County, Wisconsin